Saros cycle series 109 for lunar eclipses occurred at the moon's descending node, 18 years 11 and 1/3 days. It contained either 71 or 72 events, depending on multiple calculations.

Summary
Lunar Saros series 109, repeating every 18 years and 11 days, had a total of 72 lunar eclipse events including 17 total lunar eclipses.

List

See also
 List of lunar eclipses
 List of Saros series for lunar eclipses

Notes

External links
 www.hermit.org: Saros 109

Lunar saros series